The North Carolina End of Grade Tests are the standardized tests given to students in North Carolina and many other states like Georgia  grades 3-8. Beyond grade 8, there are End of Course Tests for students in grades 9 to 12.

North Carolina EOG Tests report out Lexile measures for students in grades 3-8. A Lexile measure can be used to match readers with targeted text and monitor growth in reading ability.

See also
List of state achievement tests in the United States
EOG Test Maker  EOG Test Maker is a provider of EOG Practice Tests, Progress Monitoring and Formative Assessment tools.
EOG Practice Tests  USATestprep is a provider of EOG Practice Tests, Progress Monitoring and Diagnostic Assessment tools to North Carolina schools.

References 

Standardized tests in the United States
Education in North Carolina